A list of films produced in France in 2002.

References

External links
 2002 in France
 2002 in French television
 French films of 2002 at the Internet Movie Database
French films of 2002 at Cinema-francais.fr

2002
Films
French